KNWC-FM, also known as Life 96.5, is a Christian radio station located in Sioux Falls, South Dakota owned and operated by University of Northwestern – St. Paul, a Christian college in St. Paul, Minnesota. KNWC-FM concentrates on contemporary Christian music.

Its studios are located on South Tallgrass Avenue in Sioux Falls, while its transmitter is located near Rowena.

Life 96.5 is the official radio station of LifeLight Festival.

2007 FM transmitter failure 
On Wednesday, January 24, 2007, KNWC-FM's main transmitter, which had been in service since 1983, failed. New parts were ordered so that the transmitter could serve as a backup in the future, as there was no backup main transmitter.  This forced the purchase of a new transmitter.  On Thursday, February 8, 2007, Life 96.5 was back up to full power, operating on the original transmitter; the new, permanent transmitter would be installed at a later date.

On Tuesday, March 6, 2007, the transmitter was again down.  The new transmitter was installed on Thursday, March 8, 2007, but ice on the tower from a blizzard fell on the antenna, which resulted in more damage.  That forced KNWC-FM to operate at low power on a backup antenna until the problem could be corrected.  In late March 2007, KNWC-FM was operating at higher, but still reduced, power.  KNWC-FM announced that the new antenna would be installed in May 2007, and Life 96.5 would operate on reduced power until then. After a long summer at reduced power due to circumstances beyond control, station manager Jeff Rupp announced KNWC-FM was back to full power on Friday, August 31, 2007.

2013 antenna failure 

In May 2013, an ice storm took out KNWC-FM's antenna, forcing the station to briefly broadcast with lower power.

Refuge Radio acquisition 

The disbanding of Refuge Radio upon its donation to UNWSP in 2019 resulted in a substantial increase to KNWC-FM's network of translators, including a full-power repeater, KRGM in Marshall, Minnesota.

Translators

References

External links 
 

Northwestern College website
Souled Out Radio website

NWC-FM
NWC-FM
NWC-FM
Mass media in the Mitchell, South Dakota micropolitan area
Sioux Falls, South Dakota
Mitchell, South Dakota
Sioux City, Iowa
Radio stations established in 1969
1969 establishments in South Dakota
Northwestern Media